Mustafa is a common Arabic male given name.

Mustafa may also refer to:

Locations
 Mustafa Centre, a shopping mall in Singapore
 Si-Mustapha, a town in Algeria

Fictional locations
 Mustafar, a fictional exoplanet in the Star Wars universe

People
 Mustafa, an Olympic medalist marksman from Syria in American Sniper
 Kama Mustafa or Charles Wright (born 1961), former professional wrestler
 Mustafa Saed (born 1966), American professional wrestler

Fictional characters
 Mustafa (Austin Powers), a character in Austin Powers
 Mustafa, a character in Ratatouille

Film
 Mustafa (film), a 2008 documentary by Can Dündar

Music
 "Mustapha" (Queen song), a song by Queen from their album Jazz
 An Egyptian multilingual song (also known as "Ya Mustafa") existing in many versions and languages

Science
 Mustafa Prize a grand science and technology award established in 2015

See also
 Mustafa Pasha (disambiguation)